Clare Mary Francis  (born 17 April 1946) is a British novelist who was first known for her career as a yachtswoman who has twice sailed across the Atlantic on her own and she was the first woman to captain a successful boat on the Whitbread Around the World race.

Early life
Francis was born in Thames Ditton in Surrey and spent summer holidays on the Isle of Wight, where she learnt to sail. She was educated at the Royal Ballet School, then gained a degree in Economics at University College London.

Sailing
In 1973, after working in marketing for three years, she took leave to sail singlehandedly across the Atlantic in the Nicholson 32 Gulliver G, departing from Falmouth in Cornwall and arriving, 37 days later, at Newport, Rhode Island. Following this, she received sponsorship to take part in the 1974 Round Britain Race with Eve Bonham, again in Gulliver G. They finished in third place. In 1975, she took part in the Azores and Back and the L'Aurore singlehanded races; and, in 1976, she competed in the Observer Singlehanded Transatlantic Race in her Ohlson 38 yacht Robertson's Golly, finishing thirteenth overall and setting a new women's single-handed transatlantic record. She also took part in that year's L'Aurore singlehanded race. During 1977 and 1978, she became the first woman to skipper a yacht in the Whitbread Round the World Race, finishing in fifth place in her Swan 65 ADC Accutrac.

3rd Worthing Scout Group (in Worthing, West Sussex, England) have named their 3 cub packs after famous solo sailors. 'Francis' Cub Pack is named in honour of Clare Francis.

Personal life
Francis married a draughtsman named Jacques Redon in 1977. He became a crew member on her yacht. They divorced in 1986. The marriage produced one child. Francis suffers from chronic fatigue syndrome and is a trustee of the UK charity Action for ME.

Writing
After writing three accounts of her experiences while sailing, she turned to fiction and is the author of eight best-sellers.

Publications

Fiction
Night Sky (1983)
Red Crystal (1985)
Wolf Winter (1987)
Requiem (1989)
The Killing Winds (1992)
Deceit (1993)
Betrayal (1995)
A Dark Devotion (1997)
Keep Me Close (1999)
A Death Divided (2001)
Homeland (2003)
Unforgotten (2008)

Short stories
"The Holiday" (2005), published in The Detection Collection, edited by Simon Brett.

Non-fiction
Woman Alone (1977)
Come Hell or High Water (1977)
Come Wind or Weather (1978)
The Commanding Sea (1981)

As editor
A Feast of Stories (1996 anthology; co-edited)

References

External links
Clare Francis's website
Photos of Robertson's Golly

1946 births
Living people
Members of the Order of the British Empire
People from Thames Ditton
People educated at the Royal Ballet School
Alumni of University College London
English female sailors (sport)
Single-handed sailors
Volvo Ocean Race sailors
Circumnavigators of the globe
20th-century British women writers
21st-century British women writers
British women novelists
20th-century English novelists
21st-century English novelists
People with chronic fatigue syndrome